The ruins of Streitburg Castle ( or Streitberg Castle (Burgruine Streitberg) are the remains of a high mediaeval aristocratic castle above the village of Streitberg, in the market borough of Wiesenttal in the Upper Franconian county of Forchheim in the German state of Bavaria. They lie directly opposite the ruins of Neideck Castle, the symbol of Franconian Switzerland, on the other side of the valley.

The ruins are freely accessible to the public.

Location 

The ruins may be reached on footpaths from the village or the surrounding area.

Near the ruins of Streitburg are other former castles: to the northeast is the burgstall of Kulk on the hill named Guckhüll, to the southeast is Neideck Castle and the former motte castle of Wöhr which is on a former river island of the Wiesent near the hamlet of the same name. About 250 metres southwest and above the Neideck is the site of Wartleiten Castle, in the area of the present cemetery in Niederfellendorf is a castle site of the Fellendorfs and on the Hummerstein above Gasseldorf an early mediaeval burgstall.

Literature 
 Ursula Pfistermeister: Wehrhaftes Franken – Band 3: Burgen, Kirchenburgen, Stadtmauern um Bamberg, Bayreuth und Coburg. Fachverlag Hans Carl GmbH, Nuremberg, 2002, pp. 119–120.
 Gustav Voit, Brigitte Kaulich, Walter Rüfer: Vom Land im Gebirg zur Fränkischen Schweiz – Eine Landschaft wird entdeckt. (Schriftenreihe des Fränkische-Schweiz-Vereins, Vol. 8) Verlag Palm und Enke, Erlangen, 1992, pp. 145–156.
 Gustav Voit, Walter Rüfer: Eine Burgenreise durch die Fränkische Schweiz. Verlag Palm und Enke, Erlangen, 1991, pp. 178–183.
 Björn-Uwe Abels, Joachim Zeune, et al.: Führer zu archäologischen Denkmälern in Deutschland, Band 20: Fränkische Schweiz. Konrad Theiss Verlag GmbH und Co., Stuttgart, 1990, pp. 245–246.
 Hellmut Kunstmann: Die Burgen der südwestlichen Fränkischen Schweiz. Kommissionsverlag Degener und Co., Neustadt an der Aisch, 1990, pp. 58–87.
 Hans Vollet, Kathrin Heckel: Die Ruinenzeichnungen des Plassenburgkartographen Johann Christoph Stierlein. Kulmbach, 1987.
 Brigitte Kaulich, Gustav Voit, u.A.: Rund um die Neideck. Verlag Palm und Enke, Erlangen, 1983, pp. 282–288.
 Karl Bosl: Handbuch der historischen Stätten Deutschlands Band VII. Stuttgart, 1981, .
 Toni Eckert, Susanne Fischer, Renate Freitag, Rainer Hofmann, Walter Tausendpfund: Die Burgen der Fränkischen Schweiz: Ein Kulturführer. Gürtler Druck, Forchheim o.J., pp. 143–147.

External links 

 Ruins of Streitburg Castle at Burgenwelt.de
 Short history of Streitburg Castle

References 

Hill castles
Castles in Bavaria
Heritage sites in Bavaria
Franconian Switzerland
Forchheim (district)
Wiesenttal